"Let a Man Come In and Do the Popcorn" is a song by James Brown. Brown's 1969 recording of the song was split into two parts which were released consecutively as singles. Both of the singles charted, with Part One rising to #2 R&B and #21 Pop and Part Two reaching #6 R&B and #40 Pop. The full recording of the song was included on the 1970 album It's a New Day - Let a Man Come In.

References

External links
 "Popcorn Unlimited", an article by Douglas Wolk about James Brown's "Popcorn" records

James Brown songs
Songs written by James Brown
1969 singles
1969 songs
King Records (United States) singles